The 2021–22 First Professional Football League, also known as efbet League for sponsorship reasons, was the 98th season of the top division of the Bulgarian football league system, the 74th since a league format was adopted for the national competition of A Group as a top tier of the pyramid, and also the 6th season of the First Professional Football League, which decides the Bulgarian champion. Ludogorets Razgrad were the defending champions for the 10th consecutive time. They clinched their 11th title with four games to spare on 17 April 2022, following a 4–1 home win over Slavia Sofia.

Summary
This was the last season featuring 14 teams; from next season, the league will expand from 14 to 16 teams, with the 14th placed team from this season being automatically relegated to the Second League, while the first three-placed teams were automatically promoted from the Second League and the 13th placed team from the First League qualified for the relegation play-off, facing the 4th placed team from the second league.

Teams
Fourteen teams competed in the league – the top eleven teams from the previous season, the top two teams from the Second League, and the winner of the promotion/relegation play-off between the third-placed team from the 2020–21 Second League and the 12th placed team from the 2020–21 First League.

The first team to earn promotion was Pirin Blagoevgrad, who were promoted after winning 2–0 against Litex Lovech on 23 April 2021. Pirin returned to the top tier after a 3-year absence, having last competed in the highest level during the 2017–18 season. The second team to earn promotion was Lokomotiv Sofia, who were promoted after winning 4–1 against Septemvri Simitli on 13 May 2021. Lokomotiv returned to the top tier after a 6-year absence, having last competed in the highest level during the 2014–15 season.

Botev Vratsa won the promotion/relegation play-off 1–0 against Septemvri Sofia on 28 May 2021, thus remaining in the First League.

Stadiums and locations

Personnel and kits
Note: Flags indicate national team as has been defined under FIFA eligibility rules. Players and managers may hold more than one non-FIFA nationality.

Note: Individual clubs may wear jerseys with advertising. However, only one sponsorship is permitted per jersey for official tournaments organised by UEFA in addition to that of the kit manufacturer (exceptions are made for non-profit organisations).
Clubs in the domestic league can have more than one sponsorship per jersey which can feature on the front of the shirt, incorporated with the main sponsor or in place of it; or on the back, either below the squad number or on the collar area. Shorts also have space available for advertisement.

Managerial changes

Regular season

League table

Results

Results by round

Championship round

Championship round table
Points and goals will carry over in full from regular season.

Europa Conference League round
Points and goals will carry over in full from regular season.

Europa Conference League round table

Relegation round
Points and goals will carry over in full from regular season.

Relegation round table

Europa Conference League play-off

Promotion/relegation play-off

Season statistics

Top scorers

Most assists

Clean sheets

Hat-tricks

Goal of the week

Note: The top 3 goals of the week are selected for voting and the winner will be placed here.

Save of the week

Note: The top 3 goalkeeper saves of the week are selected for voting by Yordan Gospodinov and the winner will be placed here.

References

Notes

First Professional Football League (Bulgaria) seasons
Bulgaria
1